On Record may refer to:

 On Record (album), album by April Wine
 On Record (film), 1917 silent film

See also
 For the Record (disambiguation)
 Off the Record (disambiguation)
 On the record (disambiguation)
 Record (disambiguation)